Congress of Rastatt refers to:
First Congress of Rastatt in 1713 between Austria and France
Second Congress of Rastatt in 1797 during the French Revolutionary Wars